Ayoub Skouma (born 22 March 1988 in Casablanca) is a Moroccan footballer who is currently playing for Wydad AC.

Career
On 4 July 2009 had a trial with Standard Liège the transfer fee of the Wydad AC player is 800,000 €uro.

References

External links
 Mountakhab.net - Fiches de joueurs: Ayoub Skouma

Living people
1981 births
Footballers from Casablanca
Moroccan footballers
Wydad AC players
Difaâ Hassani El Jadidi players
Moroccan expatriate footballers
Expatriate footballers in Kuwait
Association football defenders
Fath Union Sport players
Kuwait Premier League players
Moroccan expatriate sportspeople in Kuwait
Botola players
Khaitan SC players